Anaseini Takipō Afuhaamango (1 March 1893 – 26 November 1918) was the Queen consort of Tonga from 1909 to 1918. She was the second wife of George Tupou II. Her name was also often rendered as Ana Seini Takipo.

Life
Anaseini Takipō Afuhaamango was born on 1 March 1893 in Nukualofa. Her father was Tēvita Ula Afuhaamango and her mother was Siosiana Tongovua Tae Manusā. From her maternal relation, she was a descendant of the Tui Kanokupolu line. King George Tupou II had rejected her half-sister Ofakivavau in 1899 to marry Lavinia Veiongo, a choice that damaged the royal family's relation with the rest of the country and nearly caused a civil war between factions loyal to the family of Ofa and the family of Lavinia. Both women died in 1901 and 1902 respectively and the grief-strickened king remained unmarried with only one legitimate daughter Princess Sālote Mafile‘o Pilolevu, who was an unpopular heir with the former supporters of the deceased Ofa.

In order to appease his subjects and the Council of Chiefs, King Tupou II married Anaseini Takipō, the sister of the rejected Ofa, on 11 November 1909. She was sixteen years old at the time of the marriage. It was expected that the King would be able to produce a male heir to succeed him to the throne. Queen Lavinia's daughter Princess Sālote was sent Auckland, New Zealand, as a form of exile.

Queen Takipō gave birth to two daughters: Elisiva Fusipala Taukionelua (1911–1911, known as Princess Onelua) and Elisiva Fusipala Taukionetuku (1912–1933, known as Princess Fusipala). Princess Onelua died of convulsion in her infancy and Princess Fusipala died in Australia unmarried.

Her husband died on 5 April 1918 and was succeeded by his eldest daughter, who became Queen Sālote Tupou III, the first queen regnant of Tonga. Shortly after, Queen Dowager Takipō died at Finefekai, Nukualofa, on 26 November 1918, as a result of the infamous 1918 flu pandemic which killed eight percent of the population of Tonga. After Takipō's death, Sālote assumed the guardianship of her half-sister Princess Fusipala. She was buried at Malaealoa, the chiefly burial ground in Kolomotua, instead of Malaekula where her husband and daughters were buried.

Family tree

References

Bibliography

External links

Tongan royalty
1893 births
1918 deaths
People from Nukualofa
Tongan royal consorts
Deaths from Spanish flu
20th-century Tongan women
20th-century Tongan people